Castizo is a racial category used in 18th-century Colonial Mexico to refer to people who were three-quarters Spanish by descent and one-quarter Amerindian. The feminine form of the word is castiza. In the early 21st century, the term castizo has also come to mean mixed-race people with light skin, in comparison to mulattos, pardos, and coyotes, who would be mixed-race people with darker skin.

The category was widely recognized by the 18th century in colonial Mexico and was a standard category portrayed in eighteenth-century casta paintings.

History
In the taxonomic chart accompanying a work on casta paintings, castizo is given as "uncertain origin".  It appears in 1543 with the meaning "class, condition, social position" (calidad, clase o condición).

The term castizo applied to the offspring of a union of a Spaniard and a mestiza (offspring of a Spaniard and an Indian woman); that is, someone who is of three-quarters Spanish and one-quarter Amerindian ancestry. During this era, various other terms (mestizo, cuarterón de indio, etc.) were also used.  

Most scholars do not view the racial labels and hierarchical ordering as a rigid or official "system of castes," since there was considerable fluidity in the designations. Individuals might be classified or identify themselves with different categories at different points in their lives. Sometimes different labels were used simultaneously in the same documentation. Castizo was a category used in colonial Mexico. 

Marriage licenses required a declaration of racial status for each partner. The category castizo "was widely recognized by the eighteenth century; castizos still did not appear in great numbers [in parish documentation] even though they were widely distributed throughout New Spain." In colonial censuses, officials sought to keep track of certain categories, particularly where a person could claim to be a Spaniard. "In the [colonial Mexican] censuses of white/mestizo households, provisions were made to keep accurate records of castizos. The flexibility of having three categories (mestizo, castizo, and español) provided census takers a broader framework within which to capture differences of phenotype — presumably in hopes of closely regulating entry into the coveted español caste." Some were classified as castizos rather than españoles, but "their castizo status allowed them to maintain social elevation with the broader mestizo mainstream."

An eighteenth-century visitor to colonial Mexico published the following observation about race mixture between Spaniards and Amerindians: 
"If the mixed-blood is the offspring of a Spaniard and an Indian, the stigma [of race mixture] disappears at the third step in descent because it is held as systematic that a Spaniard and an Indian produce a mestizo; a mestizo and a Spaniard, a castizo; and a castizo and a Spaniard, a Spaniard. [Note: This person is 7/8 Spanish by ancestry]. The admixture of Indian blood should not indeed be regarded as a blemish, since the provisions of law give the Indian all that he could wish for, and Philip II granted to mestizos the privilege of becoming priests. On this consideration is based the common estimation of descent from a union of Indian and European or creole Spaniard."

See also
Casta
Cholo
Mestizo
Quadroon
Peninsulares
White Latin American

Notes

References

Spanish colonization of the Americas
History of Madrid
Spanish culture
Spanish language
Latin American caste system
Mestizo